Apriona rixator is a species of beetle in the family Cerambycidae. It is known from Malaysia, Borneo, and the Philippines.

References

Batocerini
Beetles described in 1842
Beetles of Asia